Dubrovka is a station on the Moscow Central Circle of the Moscow Metro.

Passengers may make free out-of-station transfers to Dubrovka on the Lyublinsko-Dmitrovskaya Line. Free transfers are also permitted to Kozhukhovskaya on that line. The distance to Kozhukhovskaya is more than a kilometer, however.

One of the station's exits is connected to a mall directly.

Gallery

References

External links 
 
 Дубровка mkzd.ru

Moscow Metro stations
Railway stations in Russia opened in 2016
Moscow Central Circle stations